Septemvri Municipality is a municipality in the Pazardzhik Province of Bulgaria.

Demography

At the 2011 census, the population of Septemvri was 25,794. Most of the inhabitants (76.5%) were Bulgarians, and there were significant minorities of Gypsies/Romani (10.25%) and Turks (3.26%). 9.8% of the population's ethnicity was unknown.

Communities

Towns
 Septemvri
 Vetren

Villages
 Boshulya
 Dolno Varshilo
 Gorno Varshilo
 Karabunar
 Kovachevo
 Lozen
 Semchinovo
 Simeonovets
 Slavovitsa
 Varvara
 Vetren dol
 Vinogradets
 Zlokuchene

References

Municipalities in Pazardzhik Province